Aleksandr Yuryevich Khromykov (born 23 January 1984) is a Russian professional football coach and a former player. He is an assistant manager with FC Krasnodar-2.

Playing career
He played 3 seasons in the Russian Football National League for FC Dynamo Makhachkala, FC Amur Blagoveshchensk and FC Kuban Krasnodar.

External links
 
 

1984 births
People from Timashyovsky District
Living people
Russian footballers
Association football defenders
FC Kuban Krasnodar players
FC Dynamo Stavropol players
Russian football managers
FC Dynamo Makhachkala players
FC Amur Blagoveshchensk players
Sportspeople from Krasnodar Krai